Henri Eugène Padé (17 December 1863 – 9 July 1953) was a French mathematician, who is now remembered mainly for his development of Padé approximation techniques for functions using rational functions.

Education and career
Padé studied at École Normale Supérieure in Paris. He then spent a year at Leipzig University and University of Göttingen, where he studied under Felix Klein and Hermann Schwarz.

In 1890 Padé returned to France, where he taught in Lille while preparing his doctorate under Charles Hermite. His doctoral thesis described what is now known as the Padé approximant. He then became an assistant professor at Université Lille Nord de France, where he succeeded Émile Borel as a professor of rational mechanics at École centrale de Lille.

Padé taught at Lille until 1902, when he moved to Université de Poitiers. He became recteur of Académie de Besançon and Dijon in 1923. He later became Recteur of Académie de Aix-Marseilles until he retired in 1934.

External links 
 
 
 

People from Abbeville
1863 births
1953 deaths
19th-century French mathematicians
20th-century French mathematicians
École Normale Supérieure alumni
Academic staff of the Lille University of Science and Technology
Academic staff of the École centrale de Lille
Academic staff of the University of Poitiers